Honne (stylised as HONNE) are an English electronic music duo formed in 2014 in Bow, London, consisting of James Hatcher (producer) and Andy Clutterbuck (singer, producer). Honne's debut studio album, Warm on a Cold Night, was released 22 July 2016. Their second album, Love Me/Love Me Not, followed on 28 August 2018. The duo then released their first mixtape, No Song Without You, on 3 July 2020. Across these albums the band have achieved gold, platinum and multiplatinum certifications in multiple countries around the world. Their third album, Let's Just Say the World Ended a Week from Now, What Would You Do?, was released on 22 October 2021.

Music career

2014: Early career and first EPs
Clutterbuck and Hatcher met while at university and started making music together under the name of Honne—a Japanese word (本音) meaning "true feelings"—in late 2014. Honne's musical style has been described as "futuristic soul destined to re-invent babymaking music" by The Telegraph.
The band released their debut single "Warm on a Cold Night" in September 2014 via Super Recordings. They followed up with their second EP All in the Value in November 2014, and made their live debut at the Sebright Arms on the same day.

2015: Coastal Love EP and live performances
Honne started 2015 with a sold out show at Electrowerkz in London in February before announcing the release of their EP Coastal Love on their own label Tatemae Recordings, which they have released all of their works under since.
Following the release of Coastal Love on 1 May, the band played a sold out headline gig at The Laundry in London on 13 May and performed on the BBC Introducing stage at BBC Radio 1's Big Weekend 2015 in Norwich. From early to mid-2015, the band performed at various festivals in the UK and across Europe, including The Great Escape Festival, Field Day, Calvi on the Rocks, and Latitude.

2016: Warm on a Cold Night
On 22 July 2016, Honne released their first full-length album, Warm on a Cold Night. The album cover features an image taken on the night of one of their London shows. The album achieved huge popularity and success internationally, particularly in Asia, where the album has gone multi-platinum in South Korea, Thailand and Indonesia.

From late-2016 to mid-2017, the band toured extensively, performing at various festivals around Asia, Europe and North America, including Coachella, Lollapalooza, Osheaga, Wanderland, WayHome Festival and Summerwell.

On 7 April 2017, Honne released a new version of "Warm on a Cold Night" featuring American rapper Aminé. Honne released a single titled "Just Dance" on 7 July 2017.

2018: Love Me/Love Me Not
Honne released their second album, Love Me/Love Me Not on 24 August 2018. The album features Tom Misch, Georgia, Anna of the North, Beka, and Nana Rogues. The album continued to build on their success, again going multi-platinum or gold in multiple territories. 

On 27 March 2019, the band released a new version of "Crying Over You" featuring RM of BTS. On 3 November 2018, the duo released a stripped back live performance of "Location Unknown" featuring Beka. This version of the track was particularly well received, gaining over 126 million views on YouTube and over 92 million streams on Spotify, and later got synced to the film Ali & Ratu Ratu Queens.

The album campaign saw the band touring in many parts of the world, as well as playing several festivals including All Points East, Corona Capital, NOS Alive, Shaky Knees, Lollapalooza Stockholm, and Sziget Festival.

2020: No Song Without You 
On 3 July 2020, during the global coronavirus pandemic, Honne released the mixtape No Song Without You.

2021: Let's Just Say the World Ended a Week from Now, What Would You Do? 
Honne released their third studio album, Let's Just Say the World Ended a Week from Now, What Would You Do?, on 22 October 2021. Singles from the album include features from Khalid, Griff, Niki, Pink Sweats, and Sofía Valdés. Other non-featuring collaborators on the album include Sam Smith and Arlo Parks.

Discography

Studio albums

Mixtapes

Extended plays

Songwriting & Production Credits

Remixes

References

External links
 

Atlantic Records artists
English electronic music duos
Living people
Musical groups established in 2014
Musical groups from London
Year of birth missing (living people)
2014 establishments in England
Male musical duos